Mamadou Coulibaly (born 26 May 1980) is an Ivorian retired footballer who played as a left-back for the Ivory Coast national team. Coulibaly played for professional clubs in the Ivory Coast, Belgium, Denmark, Greece, and Luxembourg.

International career
Coulibaly first represented the Ivory Coast national team in a 2–2 2002 FIFA World Cup qualification tie with Rwanda on 9 April 2000.

References

External links
 
 
 

1980 births
Living people
People from Bouaké
Ivorian footballers
Ivory Coast international footballers
Association football fullbacks
K.S.C. Lokeren Oost-Vlaanderen players
FC Nordsjælland players
Ligue 1 (Ivory Coast) players
Belgian Pro League players
Danish Superliga players
Football League (Greece) players
Luxembourg National Division players
Ivorian expatriates in Belgium
Ivorian expatriates in Denmark
Ivorian expatriates in Greece
Ivorian expatriate sportspeople in Luxembourg
Expatriate footballers in Belgium
Expatriate men's footballers in Denmark
Expatriate footballers in Greece
Expatriate footballers in Luxembourg